Racing Extinction is a 2015 documentary about the ongoing anthropogenic mass extinction of species and the efforts from scientists, activists and journalists to document it by Oscar-winning director Louie Psihoyos, who directed the documentary The Cove (2009). The film received one Oscar nomination, for Best Original Song, and one Emmy nomination for Exceptional Merit in Documentary Filmmaking. Racing Extinction premiered at the 2015 Sundance Film Festival, followed by limited theater release, with worldwide broadcast premiere on The Discovery Channel in 220 countries or territories on December 2, 2015.

Racing Extinction′s website details further information about contemporary extinction and campaigns with which to prevent them. The film was created by the Oceanic Preservation Society.

Synopsis
The film deals with several examples of the overarching theme of the Anthropocene Extinction, in that the spread of Homo sapiens has caused the greatest mass extinction since the KT event 66 million years ago, including climate change and poaching, and the efforts of scientists, photographers and volunteers to protect endangered species. The film implicates human overpopulation, globalization and animal agriculture as leading causes of extinction.

The film deals with the illegal wildlife trade, including the filmmakers exposing a whale meat restaurant in the US (on the same day Louie Psihoyos was originally planning to collect his Academy Award for The Cove) and covert undercover investigations of the shark fin and Manta ray gill trade in Hong Kong and mainland China for traditional medicines. The film also documents successful efforts to include manta rays on the CITES Appendix II list of protected species, thus stopping the village of Lamakera on Solor in Indonesia from killing them to supply demand in China.

The film refers to the Baiji and the Hawaiʻi ʻōʻō as recent examples of extinction (although both of these species are still believed by some to be extant), and identifies the Amphibian extinction crisis, the overfishing of sharks for shark fin soup and as bycatch, among others, as current causes for concern. More specific examples include the imminent extinctions of the Florida grasshopper sparrow and Rabb's fringe-limbed treefrog (the last individual of which, Toughie, Joel Sartore photographs).

Anthropogenic climate change from greenhouse gas emissions is identified as a leading cause of extinction, as organisms cannot adapt to unprecedented changes in not only temperature, but weather, ocean chemistry and atmospheric composition. The film focuses on the amount of methane produced by livestock, particularly cattle, and trapped methane escaping from frozen reservoirs in the Arctic, the latter drawing parallels to the runaway greenhouse effect that may have caused the Permian mass extinction that wiped out 95% of species. Carbon dioxide and methane emissions from transportation, animals and factories are made visible to the human eye for the first time with a specially designed high definition FLIR (forward looking infra red) camera, with a special color filter. Ocean acidification and the subsequent degradation of corals and other calcium carbonate-based marine organisms are revealed with lab experiments and comparisons of archived photographs to the state of the same reefs in the 2010s. The degradation of marine ecosystems and the implications of coastal habitations are highlighted.

The filmmakers also work with Obscura Digital to design a custom Tesla Model S fitted with a 15,000 lumen projector system to project images of critically endangered and extinct species onto public buildings including Shell factories, Wall Street, Headquarters of the United Nations, the Empire State Building and the Vatican. They go visit the village Lamakera, Indonesia in order to convince the village to stop fishing manta rays. As well as the greenhouse gas camera previously mentioned and the projector, it is also the first car in the world with electro-luminescent paint, inspired by bioluminescent organisms, and projects endangered animal sounds from the Bioacoustics Research Program. This campaign aimed to raise awareness and encourage people to change habits to ensure the survival of species for future generations, further highlighted with the 'Start With One Thing' Campaign.

Cast
Several notable persons had an appearance in this film, including:
 Elon Musk of Tesla Motors 
 National Geographic photographer Joel Sartore, founder of The Photo Ark project
 Primatologist Jane Goodall
 Author and columnist Elizabeth Kolbert
 Professor Stuart Pimm
 Christopher W. Clark (director of the Bioacoustics Research Program (BRP))
 Race car driver and environmentalist Leilani Münter
 Artist Shawn Heinrichs
 Conservationist and Photographer Paul Hilton 
Obscura Digital customized the Tesla Model S car used for the projections.

Reception
Racing Extinction was generally acclaimed by critics. The film is nominated for an Emmy Award for Exceptional Merit in Documentary Filmmaking. The film holds a Metacritic score of 81/100. It was also praised as a "return to form" for the Discovery Channel, in that it represented a break from the numerous pseudoscience-based mockumentaries that the network was airing at the time. The film did receive the Cinema for Peace International Green Film Award in 2016.

Soundtrack

A soundtrack was released via Rumor Mill Records on November 6, 2015. The main theme of the documentary is a song called "One Candle" featuring the vocals of Australian singer-songwriter, Sia. To promote this track, a music video was created using images of animals projected onto the side of the Empire State Building in New York.

At the 88th Academy Awards, "Manta Ray" by J. Ralph & Anohni was nominated for Best Original Song. Other nominees competing in this category were "Earned It" from Fifty Shades of Grey, "Til It Happens to You" from The Hunting Ground, "Simple Song #3" from Youth, and "Writing's on the Wall" from Spectre. "Writing's On the Wall", by Sam Smith, was the winner.

See also
 Anthropocene
 Decline in amphibian populations
 Extinction risk from global warming
 Holocene extinction event
 Ocean acidification
 The Photo Ark
 The Sixth Extinction: An Unnatural History
 List of vegan media

References

External links
 
 
 

2015 films
2015 documentary films
American documentary films
Documentary films about environmental issues
Kickstarter-funded documentaries
Films directed by Louie Psihoyos
2010s English-language films
2010s American films